Acklam is a small village and civil parish in the Ryedale district of North Yorkshire, England although it is historically part of the East Riding of Yorkshire.

History

Acklam is mentioned in the Domesday Book as Aclum in the East Riding and gave its name to the Hundred. The Lord in 1066 was named as Siward and comprised 4 ploughlands with 2 Lord's plough teams and a church. The village lay within the ancient Wapentake of Buckrose

The etymology of the name is derived from Old English āc (an oak tree) and lēah (a forest or wood clearing).

There are the remains of an earthwork motte and bailey castle on a ridge overlooking the village to the south.

Governance

The village lies within the Westminster Parliamentary Constituency of Thirsk and Malton; the Norton Electoral Division of North Yorkshire County Council; and the Derwent Ward of Ryedale District Council.

Demographics
According to the 2001 UK census, Acklam parish had a population of 183, reducing to 168 at the 2011 Census. The 2011 census also showed that there were 72 dwellings in the Parish.

Community

There is no school in the village, but it is within the catchment area for Leavening Community Primary School one mile north of the village and the catchment area of Norton College for Secondary Education. The village is served by a District Council assisted service once per day.

Religion

There is a church in the village dedicated to St John the Baptist. It is part of the united Parish of West Buckrose in the Deanery of Southern Ryedale along with eight other churches. The church is housed in what used to be the Wesleyan Methodist Chapel, built in 1794 after the Anglican Church was demolished.

References

External links
 

Villages in North Yorkshire
Civil parishes in North Yorkshire